Jesuit(s) Garden(s) may refer to:
Jesuit Garden (Beirut), park
Xiyang Lou, historical park in Beijing, also known as Jesuit Garden
Ivan Franko Park in Lviv, Ukraine, formerly known as "Jesuit Gardens"
Jesuit Garden, part of public park in the Český Krumlov Castle